Larry Cannon may refer to:
Larry Cannon (basketball) (born 1947), retired American basketball player
Larry Cannon (racing driver) (1937–1995), American racecar driver
Lawrence Cannon (born 1947), Canadian politician